HD 208527 is a star located in the northern constellation of Pegasus. It has a reddish hue and is dimly visible to the naked eye with an apparent visual magnitude of +6.39. The star is located at a distance of approximately 1,300 light years from the Sun based on parallax, and is drifting further away with a radial velocity of +4.8 km/s.

This was once catalogued as a K-type main-sequence star with a stellar classification of K5V, but is now known as an aging red giant with a class of M1III, based on its dimensions and low surface gravity. This indicates that the two-billion year old star has exhausted the supply of hydrogen at its core then cooled and expanded off the main sequence. It has an estimated 1.6 times the mass of the Sun but has swollen to 51 times the Sun's radius.

Planetary system
From September 2008 to June 2012, the team B.-C. Lee, I. Han and M.-G. Park observed HD 208527 with "the high-resolution spectroscopy of the fiber-fed Bohyunsan Observatory Echelle Spectrograph (BOES) at Bohyunsan Optical Astronomy Observatory (BOAO)".

In 2012, a long-period, wide-orbiting planet was deduced by radial velocity. This was published in November, gaining the designation HD 208527 b. Along with HD 220074 b this is one of the first two planets proposed around a red giant.

References

M-type giants
Planetary systems with one confirmed planet
Pegasus (constellation)
Durchmusterung objects
0841.1
208527
108296
8372